The Cathedral of St. John the Baptist is a Byzantine Catholic (Ruthenian) cathedral located in Parma, Ohio, United States.  It is the cathedral for the Eparchy of Parma.

History

St. John's parish was founded in 1898 with Father Peter Keselak as its first pastor. Divine Services were initially celebrated in St. Joseph's Chapel at East 23rd and Woodland Avenue in Cleveland. A hall was then rented on East 22nd and Woodland. As the congregation continued to grow they purchased a church and parish house at East 22nd and Scovill Avenue (now East 22nd and Tri-C Way) in August 1901. The parish continued to use that facility until the property was bought by the State of Ohio for a new interstate and a new church was built in 1960 on the parish picnic grounds at its current location in Parma. The Eparchy of Parma was established in 1969 and St. John's Church became the cathedral. 

In 2021, Bishop Milan Lach merged St. John's parish with Holy Spirit parish in Parma and Dormition of the Mother of God Parish (St. Mary's) in Cleveland. The parish uses the Dormition church building for its seat and its worship site. The eparchy still lists St. John the Baptist as its cathedral.

See also
List of Catholic cathedrals in the United States
List of cathedrals in the United States

References

External links

Official Cathedral website
Eparchy of Parma website

Religious organizations established in 1898
Churches completed in 1960
Eastern Catholic churches in Ohio
Rusyn-American culture in Ohio
Rusyn-American history
Ukrainian-American culture in Ohio
John the Baptist, Parma
Churches in Cuyahoga County, Ohio
Parma, Ohio
Byzantine Revival architecture in Ohio
1960 establishments in Ohio
Eastern Catholic cathedrals in Ohio